The Dr. Randy Gregg Award is presented annually by U Sports to reward excellence in the student-athlete. The Canadian University ice hockey player who receives this award has exhibited outstanding achievement in ice hockey, academics, and community involvement.

The award is named in honour of Randy Gregg, a CIAU University Cup champion with the Alberta Golden Bears while studying to earn his medical degree, a Canadian Olympian, a professional who won five Stanley Cups with the Edmonton Oilers during his 10 seasons in the National Hockey League, and became a family physician after he retired from hockey.

Winners
1990–91: Derrick Pringle - Dalhousie University
1991–92: Doug Cherepacha - University of Toronto
1992–93: Chris Glover - Queen's University
1993–94: Craig Donaldson - University of Western Ontario
1994–95: Dana McKechnie - University of Lethbridge
1995–96: Andy Clark - Mount Allison University
1996–97: Mike Chambers - University of Waterloo
1997–98: Cam Danyluk - University of Alberta
1998–99: Brad Peddle - St. Francis Xavier University
1999–00: Mathieu Darche - McGill University
2000–01: Mike Williams - York University
2001–02: Steven Gallace - Saint Mary's University
2002–03: Blair St. Martin - University of Alberta
2004–05: Gavin McLeod - University of Alberta
2003–04: Jeff Zorn - University of Alberta
2005–06: David Chant - Saint Mary's University
2006–07: Colin Sinclair - University of New Brunswick
2007–08: Curtis Austring - University of Saskatchewan
2008–09: Andrew Brown - Saint Mary's University
2009–10: Tyler Metcalfe - University of Alberta
2010–11: Eric Hunter - University of Alberta
2011–12: Kyle Bailey - University of New Brunswick
2012–13: Jordan Knox - University of Prince Edward Island
2013–14: Ben Lindemulder - University of Alberta
2014–15: Olivier Hinse - Concordia University
2015–16: Nathan Chiarlitti - St. Francis Xavier University
2016–17: Aaron Armstrong - Ryerson University

References

Canadian ice hockey trophies and awards